Francisco Antonio Palacios Alleyne (born 10 December 1990) is a Panamanian footballer who plays as a defender for San Francisco and the Panama national team.

Club career
Palacios moved to San Francisco from Millenium Universidad in 2013. Palacios scored his first goal for the club on 29 April 2017 in a 1–2 home loss against Tauro.

International career
Palacios made his international debut for Panama on 17 April 2018 in a 1–0 friendly away win against Trinidad and Tobago. On 14 May 2018, Palacios was included in Panama's preliminary squad for the 2018 World Cup. However, he did not make the final 23.

References

External links
 

1990 births
Living people
Panamanian footballers
Panama international footballers
Association football defenders
San Francisco F.C. players
2019 CONCACAF Gold Cup players
2021 CONCACAF Gold Cup players